Hugh d'Aubigny, 5th Earl of Arundel (died 7 May 1243) was the last in the Aubigny male line to hold Arundel Castle.

He was the son of William d'Aubigny, 3rd Earl of Arundel and younger brother of William d'Aubigny, 4th Earl of Arundel. He inherited his title on the death of his elder brother in 1224. He also inherited the position of hereditary Chief Butler of England for life. In 1242, he was one of the seven earls who accompanied King Henry in his expedition to Aquitaine.

On his death, he was buried at Wymondham Abbey and his large estates were divided amongst his four sisters and their issue. His title of Earl of Arundel was inherited by his nephew John FitzAlan, 6th Earl of Arundel, son of his sister Isabel d'Aubigny.

He had married Isabel de Warenne (c. 1228–1282), daughter of William de Warenne, 5th Earl of Surrey and Maud Marshal (1192–1248). They had no children. His widow never remarried but became an important countess who founded the Cistercian Abbey at Marham and may have been buried in the Convent Church in Marham.

References

1243 deaths
05
Earls of Sussex
Year of birth unknown